Beatriz Eugenia Flamenco Mira (born 11 November 1995) is a hurdler from El Salvador. She competed in the 100 metres hurdles event at the 2015 World Championships in Beijing without qualifying for the semifinals. She won three medals at the 2014 Central American Championships in Athletics, winning her hurdles speciality and helping her nation silver in two relay events.
 
Her personal best in the 100 metres hurdles is 14.53 seconds (-0.3 m/s) set in San José, Costa Rica, in 2015. This is the current national record.

Competition record

See also
 El Salvador at the 2015 World Championships in Athletics

References

1995 births
Living people
Salvadoran female hurdlers
Place of birth missing (living people)
World Athletics Championships athletes for El Salvador
21st-century Salvadoran women